Dougie Costello (born Ireland Co Galway, 1983) is a Group 1 winning Irish jockey. He now rides on the flat, having previously been a jump jockey. He is one of the few jockeys to have won at the top level in both codes - the 2012 Triumph Hurdle at the Cheltenham Festival on Countrywide Flame, and the 2016 Commonwealth Cup on Quiet Reflection at Royal Ascot.

His family background is in hunting, and in his teens he spent time in America riding horses in time trials.

Costello made the switch from National Hunt to riding on the Flat because he felt it was better both financially and for career longevity, but he kept his options open to riding over jumps too. Initially he rode for trainers William Muir, Paul Midgley, Mark Walford and Jo Hughes. For the latter, he also rode in France. 

He linked up with trainer Karl Burke in the Autumn of 2015. Burke's Quiet Reflection has been his most successful partnership since the code switch. On the horse he won the Prix Sigy in April 2016, the Sandy Lane Stakes the following month, before two Group 1 successes in the Commonwealth Cup and Haydock Sprint Cup.

Burke ended his partnership with Costello in May 2017, saying "things didn't quite pan out as I'd hoped". Costello vowed to work twice as hard to get other big race victories.

Statistics

Flat wins in Great Britain by year

Jumps wins in Great Britain by year

Major wins 
 Great Britain
Flat
Commonwealth Cup - Quiet Reflection (2016)
Haydock Sprint Cup - Quiet Reflection (2016)
Jumps
Sefton Novices' Hurdle - Wayward Prince (2010)
Triumph Hurdle - Countrywide Flame (2012)

Notes

References 

Irish jockeys
Living people
1980s births